Erard Corbin de Mangoux (born 6 January 1953) is a French prefect and the former head of the Directorate-General for External Security (DSGE), France's foreign intelligence service.

Career timeline
 Commissaire principal de la marine (1977-1988)
 Sous-directeur de l'administration générale et des finances à la direction de l'administration de la police nationale (1999-2004)
 Secrétaire général de la préfecture des Yvelines (2004-2006)
 Directeur général des services du département des Hauts-de-Seine (2006-2007)
 Préfet hors cadre (2007)
 Conseiller pour les affaires intérieures à l'Elysée (2007-2008)

References

1953 births
Living people
French spies
Directors of the Directorate-General for External Security
Chevaliers of the Légion d'honneur
Knights of the Ordre national du Mérite
Sciences Po alumni